The Laidlaw Foundation is a Canadian charitable foundation based in Toronto, Ontario. Founded in 1949 by Robert A. Laidlaw, the institution was established with the purpose of providing financial support for charitable, conservation, educational, and cultural organizations in the Ontario region. Mr Laidlaw and his two sons, Nicholas and Roderick, gave more than 11 million dollars to the foundation out of a family fortune made from the R Laidlaw Lumber Company. 

Institutions supported by the Laidlaw Foundation over the years include the Hospital for Sick Children, the National Ballet of Canada, the National Ballet School, Upper Canada College, and the Royal Ontario Museum among many others. The foundation has also awarded numerous grants to individuals in the areas of health, education, social inclusion, culture and the arts.  In recent years the foundation has supported positive youth development through programs that focus on youth organizing for community change.

References

External links
Official Website of the Laidlaw Foundation

Foundations based in Canada
Organizations established in 1949